SD14 can refer to:

Sigma SD14 digital single-lens reflex camera produced by the Sigma Corporation of Japan
 The SD14 cargo ship built by Austin & Pickersgill